Crystal City station is an underground Washington Metro station in the Crystal City neighborhood of Arlington, Virginia, United States. The station opened on July 1, 1977 and serves the Blue Line and Yellow Line services, with a Metroway bus rapid transit stop on the surface.

Station layout

The station has two side platforms in a cylindrical vault, which runs east-west under plazas on the north side of 18th Street South between Jefferson Davis Memorial Highway and Crystal Drive. The fare mezzanine is located above the center of the platforms. The single station entrance is on the northwest corner of 18th Street South and South Bell Street, with a bank of escalators leading to an upper mezzanine. 

Located outside the station vault, the upper mezzanine has direct entrances to the underground Crystal City Shops. An elevator on the northeast corner of 18th Street South and South Bell Street connects directly to the lower mezzanine; each platform has one elevator from the mezzanine. Bus stops, including a Metroway stop served by both northbound and southbound buses, are located on South Bell Street under the 251 18th Street South building.

History

The station opened on July 1, 1977, part of the  initial segment of the Blue Line between National Airport and Stadium–Armory stations that opened that day.

Metroway bus rapid transit service began on August 24, 2014, with a stop on Bell Street adjacent to the Metro entrance.

Second entrance
An east entrance to the station was proposed in a 2002 WMATA study. Planning for the second entrance began in 2011. A 2014 study identified five possible locations for the new entrance, with locations on the northeast and northwest corners of 18th Street South and Crystal Drive preferred. In February 2019, the state committed to building the entrance as part of a package of transportation improvements for the construction of Amazon HQ2 in National Landing. In May 2019, property developer JBG Smith sent an unsolicited proposal, proposing that Arlington County pay the company to act as design-build contractor for the entrance on company-owned property. The county and company signed a preliminary agreement in June 2020. Design of the second entrance reached 30% in March 2021. In March 2022, plans were changed from an underground to a surface-level fare lobby to reduce costs.

References

External links

 18th Street entrance from Google Maps Street View
City of Arlington - Crystal City Metro Station Second Entrance

Stations on the Blue Line (Washington Metro)
Crystal City, Arlington, Virginia
Transportation in Arlington County, Virginia
Washington Metro stations in Virginia
Stations on the Yellow Line (Washington Metro)
Railway stations in the United States opened in 1977
1977 establishments in Virginia
Railway stations located underground in Virginia